The following is a list of individuals who have managed the Major League Baseball All-Star Game over the years (except 1945), since its inauguration in 1933. Chosen managers and winning pennant managers manage teams including American and National Leagues.

No official MLB All-Star Game was held in 1945 (cancelled April 24, 1945) including the official MLB selection of that season's All-Stars (Associated Press All-Star Game; game was not played). MLB played two All-Star Games from 1959 through 1962.

MLB All-Star Game managers

American League
1933 - Connie Mack - Philadelphia Athletics
1934 - Joe Cronin - Washington Senators
1935 - Mickey Cochrane - Detroit Tigers
1936 - Joe McCarthy - New York Yankees
1937 - Joe McCarthy - New York Yankees
1938 - Joe McCarthy - New York Yankees
1939 - Joe McCarthy - New York Yankees
1940 - Joe Cronin - Boston Red Sox
1941 - Del Baker - Detroit Tigers
1942 - Joe McCarthy - New York Yankees
1943 - Joe McCarthy - New York Yankees
1944 - Joe McCarthy - New York Yankees
1945 - Luke Sewell - St. Louis Browns (No MLB game/managers)
1946 - Steve O'Neill - Detroit Tigers
1947 - Joe Cronin - Boston Red Sox
1948 - Bucky Harris - New York Yankees
1949 - Lou Boudreau - Cleveland Indians
1950 - Casey Stengel - New York Yankees
1951 - Casey Stengel - New York Yankees
1952 - Casey Stengel - New York Yankees
1953 - Casey Stengel - New York Yankees
1954 - Casey Stengel - New York Yankees
1955 - Al López - Cleveland Indians
1956 - Casey Stengel - New York Yankees
1957 - Casey Stengel - New York Yankees
1958 - Casey Stengel - New York Yankees
1959 - Casey Stengel - New York Yankees
1960 - Al López - Chicago White Sox
1961 - Paul Richards - Baltimore Orioles 
1962 - Ralph Houk - New York Yankees
1963 - Ralph Houk - New York Yankees
1964 - Al López - Chicago White Sox
1965 - Al López - Chicago White Sox
1966 - Sam Mele - Minnesota Twins
1967 - Hank Bauer - Baltimore Orioles
1968 - Dick Williams - Boston Red Sox
1969 - Mayo Smith - Detroit Tigers
1970 - Earl Weaver - Baltimore Orioles
1971 - Earl Weaver - Baltimore Orioles
1972 - Earl Weaver - Baltimore Orioles
1973 - Dick Williams - Oakland Athletics
1974 - Dick Williams - California Angels
1975 - Alvin Dark - Oakland Athletics
1976 - Darrell Johnson - Boston Red Sox
1977 - Billy Martin - New York Yankees
1978 - Billy Martin - New York Yankees
1979 - Bob Lemon - New York Yankees
1980 - Earl Weaver - Baltimore Orioles
1981 - Jim Frey - Kansas City Royals
1982 - Billy Martin - Oakland Athletics
1983 - Harvey Kuenn - Milwaukee Brewers
1984 - Joe Altobelli - Baltimore Orioles
1985 - Sparky Anderson - Detroit Tigers
1986 - Dick Howser - Kansas City Royals
1987 - John McNamara - Boston Red Sox
1988 - Tom Kelly - Minnesota Twins
1989 - Tony La Russa - Oakland Athletics
1990 - Tony La Russa - Oakland Athletics
1991 - Tony La Russa - Oakland Athletics
1992 - Tom Kelly - Minnesota Twins
1993 - Cito Gaston - Toronto Blue Jays
1994 - Cito Gaston - Toronto Blue Jays
1995 - Buck Showalter - New York Yankees
1996 - Mike Hargrove - Cleveland Indians
1997 - Joe Torre - New York Yankees
1998 - Mike Hargrove - Cleveland Indians
1999 - Joe Torre - New York Yankees
2000 - Joe Torre - New York Yankees
2001 - Joe Torre - New York Yankees
2002 - Joe Torre - New York Yankees
2003 - Mike Scioscia - Anaheim Angels
2004 - Joe Torre - New York Yankees
2005 - Terry Francona - Boston Red Sox
2006 - Ozzie Guillén - Chicago White Sox
2007 - Jim Leyland - Detroit Tigers
2008 - Terry Francona - Boston Red Sox
2009 - Joe Maddon - Tampa Bay Rays
2010 - Joe Girardi - New York Yankees
2011 - Ron Washington - Texas Rangers
2012 - Ron Washington - Texas Rangers
2013 - Jim Leyland - Detroit Tigers
2014 - John Farrell - Boston Red Sox
2015 - Ned Yost - Kansas City Royals
2016 - Ned Yost - Kansas City Royals
2017 - Brad Mills - Cleveland Indians **filling in for Terry Francona who had to leave due to an emergency surgery
2018 - A. J. Hinch - Houston Astros
2019 - Alex Cora - Boston Red Sox
2021 - Kevin Cash - Tampa Bay Rays
2022 - Dusty Baker - Houston Astros

*Williams won the 1974 A.L. pennant with the Oakland Athletics.
There was no All-Star Game in 2020 due to the COVID-19 pandemic.  Managers for the 2021 Game are managers of the teams that participated in the 2020 World Series.
Casey Stengel was fired by the Yankees following the 1960 World Series. Paul Richards was chosen as his replacement since the Orioles finished in second place in 1960.

National League
1933 - John McGraw - New York Giants
1934 - Bill Terry - New York Giants
1935 - Frankie Frisch - St. Louis Cardinals
1936 - Charlie Grimm - Chicago Cubs
1937 - Bill Terry - New York Giants
1938 - Bill Terry - New York Giants
1939 - Gabby Hartnett - Chicago Cubs
1940 - Bill McKechnie - Cincinnati Reds
1941 - Bill McKechnie - Cincinnati Reds
1942 - Leo Durocher - Brooklyn Dodgers
1943 - Billy Southworth - St. Louis Cardinals
1944 - Billy Southworth - St. Louis Cardinals
1945 - Billy Southworth - St. Louis Cardinals (No MLB game/managers)
1946 - Charlie Grimm - Chicago Cubs
1947 - Eddie Dyer - St. Louis Cardinals
1948 - Leo Durocher - Brooklyn Dodgers
1949 - Billy Southworth - Boston Braves
1950 - Burt Shotton - Brooklyn Dodgers
1951 - Eddie Sawyer - Philadelphia Phillies
1952 - Leo Durocher - New York Giants
1953 - Charlie Dressen - Brooklyn Dodgers
1954 - Walter Alston - Brooklyn Dodgers
1955 - Leo Durocher - New York Giants
1956 - Walter Alston - Brooklyn Dodgers
1957 - Walter Alston - Brooklyn Dodgers
1958 - Fred Haney - Milwaukee Braves
1959 - Fred Haney - Milwaukee Braves
1960 - Walter Alston - Los Angeles Dodgers
1961 - Danny Murtaugh - Pittsburgh Pirates
1962 - Fred Hutchinson - Cincinnati Reds
1963 - Alvin Dark - San Francisco Giants
1964 - Walter Alston - Los Angeles Dodgers
1965 - Gene Mauch - Philadelphia Phillies
1966 - Walter Alston - Los Angeles Dodgers
1967 - Walter Alston - Los Angeles Dodgers
1968 - Red Schoendienst - St. Louis Cardinals
1969 - Red Schoendienst - St. Louis Cardinals
1970 - Gil Hodges - New York Mets
1971 - Sparky Anderson - Cincinnati Reds
1972 - Danny Murtaugh - Pittsburgh Pirates
1973 - Sparky Anderson - Cincinnati Reds
1974 - Yogi Berra - New York Mets
1975 - Walter Alston - Los Angeles Dodgers
1976 - Sparky Anderson - Cincinnati Reds
1977 - Sparky Anderson - Cincinnati Reds
1978 - Tommy Lasorda - Los Angeles Dodgers
1979 - Tommy Lasorda - Los Angeles Dodgers
1980 - Chuck Tanner  - Pittsburgh Pirates
1981 - Dallas Green - Philadelphia Phillies
1982 - Tommy Lasorda - Los Angeles Dodgers
1983 - Whitey Herzog - St. Louis Cardinals
1984 - Paul Owens - Philadelphia Phillies
1985 - Dick Williams - San Diego Padres
1986 - Whitey Herzog - St. Louis Cardinals
1987 - Davey Johnson - New York Mets
1988 - Whitey Herzog - St. Louis Cardinals
1989 - Tommy Lasorda - Los Angeles Dodgers
1990 - Roger Craig - San Francisco Giants
1991 - Lou Piniella - Cincinnati Reds
1992 - Bobby Cox - Atlanta Braves
1993 - Bobby Cox - Atlanta Braves
1994 - Jim Fregosi - Philadelphia Phillies
1995 - Felipe Alou - Montreal Expos
1996 - Bobby Cox - Atlanta Braves
1997 - Bobby Cox - Atlanta Braves
1998 - Jim Leyland - Florida Marlins
1999 - Bruce Bochy - San Diego Padres
2000 - Bobby Cox - Atlanta Braves
2001 - Bobby Valentine - New York Mets
2002 - Bob Brenly - Arizona Diamondbacks
2003 - Dusty Baker - Chicago Cubs
2004 - Jack McKeon - Florida Marlins
2005 - Tony La Russa - St. Louis Cardinals
2006 - Phil Garner - Houston Astros
2007 - Tony La Russa - St. Louis Cardinals
2008 - Clint Hurdle - Colorado Rockies
2009 - Charlie Manuel - Philadelphia Phillies
2010 - Charlie Manuel - Philadelphia Phillies
2011 - Bruce Bochy - San Francisco Giants
2012 - Tony La Russa - St. Louis Cardinals
2013 - Bruce Bochy - San Francisco Giants
2014 - Mike Matheny - St. Louis Cardinals
2015 - Bruce Bochy - San Francisco Giants
2016 - Terry Collins - New York Mets
2017 - Joe Maddon - Chicago Cubs
2018 - Dave Roberts - Los Angeles Dodgers
2019 - Dave Roberts - Los Angeles Dodgers
2021 - Dave Roberts - Los Angeles Dodgers
2022 - Brian Snitker - Atlanta Braves
*Baker won the 2002 N.L. pennant with the San Francisco Giants.

**La Russa also was the American League manager from 1989-1991 while manager of the Oakland Athletics.

***MLB Commissioner Bud Selig named La Russa to manage the National League for the 2012 All-Star Game. La Russa's Cardinals won the 2011 N.L. Pennant and the 2011 World Series. La Russa was the second manager in league history to manage an All-Star Game following retirement, after John McGraw in 1933. 

There was no All-Star Game in 2020 due to the COVID-19 pandemic.  Managers for the 2021 Game were managers of the teams that participated in the 2020 World Series.

References

Managers